InMotion is a student team focused on electric racing and fast charging. InMotion is based in Helmond and is composed mostly of students from the Eindhoven University of Technology and Fontys University of Applied Sciences.

History
The team was founded in 2012 by Albert Maas under the guidance of Maarten Steinbuch. 
In 2017, the Fusion, the team’s first car, was built. The Fusion is an electric formula car and holds the electric lap record in Circuit Zandvoort, Circuit Zolder and TT Circuit Assen. 
After the Fusion, the team developed an endurance race car, the Vision. Currently the team is working on a new car, a Ginetta G58 (also known as LMP3 style), which has their Electric Refueling technology and is going to compete in the 24 Hours of Le Mans, in the Garage 56 class.

Cars of InMotion

Ignition
In 2009, a group of students from the University of Applied Sciences of Utrecht presented their graduation project: an eco-friendly formula race car, the Formula Bio. Their dream was to participate in the Formula Student, a race similar to Formula 1, only for students. The Formula Bio stood for environmentally friendly and inexpensive race cars.
After they graduated, one of the group members went to study at Eindhoven University of Technology. This student, Albert Maas, came into contact with Maarten Steinbuch. Together they came up with the idea of participating in the 24 Hours of Le Mans with a fully electric car. In 2012, the InMotion student team was officially established.

Fusion

The Fusion is the fastest electric formula car in the world with a top speed of 246 km/h. The car achieves this speed due to its propulsion, aerodynamics, and the small size of the car. The power of the car is 400kW and weighs 650kg of which the monocoque weighs 60kg. The Fusion is built to break track records of circuits, and not to fit into a particular ranking, so the car does not have to meet certain restrictions.

The InMotion team launched its first full electric racing car in 2016. The car was based on the former Formula Bio car has been built on a carbon fiber chassis. The full electric engine has a better power to weight ratio compared to a Formula E car. The car made its track debut at Circuit Zandvoort during the 2016 Masters of Formula 3 event. Drivers Xavier Maassen and Jan Lammers gave the car a shakedown. In 2017 USF2000 driver Rinus van Kalmthout did a straight line test at the Automotive Campus Helmond test track (part of the A270 motorway). During the year the team improved track records for electric cars at two tracks. Beitske Visser improved the record at Zandvoort. Testdriver Maassen beat the track record for electric cars at Circuit Zolder, previously held by Bert Longin in a Tesla Roadster.

Aerodynamics
Keeping the test platform on the road requires a lot of downward pressure. The most important parts of the car that generate this pressure are the diffuser, the front wing and the rear wing. The diffuser is the floor plate of the car, which is shaped so that it creates a lower pressure under the car and thus generates downforce. The rear wing consists of three elements, one of which is adjustable. The front wing is similar. Both wings can be removed from the car so that the aerodynamics specialists can test them and gain more insight into the air flows. This is mainly done with the program ANSYS Fluent, using simulations to investigate aerodynamics. Then the data is supplemented with results from our test drives.

Monocoque
The monocoque is made of a composite with sandwich structure, which is also used in other open wheel race cars. The monocoque is not only made for drivers of average length, but even for drivers up to just under 2 meters. The total weight of the chassis is only 60 kilograms, including the bulkhead and the paint. The drivers all have her or his own pre-formed seat, making them comfortable and protected against unexpected movements.

Propulsion
The propulsion is one of the main reasons why this car is so fast. Our battery pack is about 1/3 of the total weight of the car. The Fusion has rear-wheel drive, with two Yasa 750-series engines. At the Circuit Zandvoort the car achieved a maximum speed of 246 kilometers per hour. In addition, various safety measures have been taken to ensure safety. The battery pack is constantly monitored by the battery management system, and at the smallest deviation the current is removed.

Electronic control unit (ECU)
The car contains many sensors that measure parameters such as temperature and resistance, and which register data for the models. By connecting the ECU to our computer you can read these measurements. ICT Automatizing and InMotion have designed the ECUs for the Ignition together. ICT has given the access to their Motar platform, which consists of the hardware and software of the ECU. InMotion has created the control algorithms in MATLAB and Simulink. With the Motar-Toolbox they can generate production class software based on AUTOSAR of the model at the touch of a button.

Vision
After the completion and success of the Fusion, it was time to return to our original goal. With the new knowledge we had gathered with the Fusion’s creation and an expanding team of more than fifty members, it was now time to work towards our endurance car. In early 2018 the work commenced in order to create the Vision, the visualization of the original design Albert Maas had created more than 5 years ago. It was a secret only teased to the public, a secret we revealed in September 2018 along with the new team goal. With new corporate branding, and a new goal we suited up to take on the challenges that came ahead.

Our goal is to solve the single problem that still keeps people from using an electric vehicle: charging times. The target is to reduce the charging times to the same amount of time it takes to refuel a petrol car; electric refueling. We will showcase the potential of electric refueling by joining in the Garage 56 class during the 24 Hours of Le Mans with a fully electric endurance race car in 2023. At this moment, we are developing our next car & charging system.

The next era 
In 2021, the new car will be finished. This new car is being built to show the world how Electric Refueling is used in practice. The car is based around a Ginetta chassis, to guarantee safety and reliability. Furthermore, this allows the focus of the project to remain on the development of Electric Refueling.

The first version of the battery pack operates at 657 V, has a maximum voltage of 756 V and will have a total capacity of 52 kWh. The car is able to be recharged in 7.5 minutes using 350 kW. The output current will be 400 to 500 A.

In the future, iterations will be made to increase the capacity and decrease the charging times. Both the charging system and battery will be actively cooled during charging. The powertrain has a maximum output of 400 kW. In combination with the weight of the car, 1450 kg, the car is able to reach 100 km/h in 3.5 seconds The car will make its first appearance in 2020 and is ready to compete in an endurance race in 2021.

This car is the way to show to the world what can be achieved in the future.

Student team
Passion and ambition are the great motivations of the student team. The team consists of full-time members, part-time members, and trainees. Together, from all kinds of different disciplines, they work on one mission. The uniqueness of the InMotion student team is the ultimate goal, not an annual project. Everyone who has worked with them is seen as part of the team.

In addition, the team receives regular advice from the 'technical advisory board' and 'supervisory board'. The Supervisory Board ensures that the project continues to follow a uniform line over the years. The technical advisory board consists of experienced members who meet weekly with the current engineers in order to guarantee the transfer of knowledge and to help with problems.

References

Science and technology in the Netherlands
Green vehicles
Engineering education
Dutch auto racing teams
Dutch racecar constructors